Yankeetown is an unincorporated community in Madison Township, Fayette County, Ohio, United States.

References 

Unincorporated communities in Fayette County, Ohio
Unincorporated communities in Ohio